American Teen is the debut studio album by American singer Khalid. It was released on March 3, 2017, by Right Hand Music Group and RCA Records. The album was supported by the Billboard Hot 100 top 20 singles "Location" and "Young Dumb & Broke"; as well as the third single "Saved".

In October 2017, the album was certified platinum by the Recording Industry Association of America (RIAA) for accumulating over one million in combined pure sales and album-equivalent units. The album received a Grammy Award nomination for Best Urban Contemporary Album while its lead single "Location" was nominated for Best R&B Song at the 60th Annual Grammy Awards. In March 2022, the album was certified 4× platinum by the RIAA.

Singles
The lead single from the album, called "Location" was released on January 26, 2017. The song peaked at 16 on the Billboard Hot 100. The music video for "Location" was released on September 26, 2016. "Young Dumb & Broke" was sent to rhythmic radio on June 13, 2017, as the second single. "Saved" was released as the third single on October 30, 2017.

Promotional singles
"Let's Go" was released as the first promotional single from the album on September 12, 2016. It is also Khalid's first released song. "Hopeless" was released as the second promotional single on October 27, 2016. "Coaster" was released as the third promotional single on December 16, 2016. "Shot Down" was released as the fourth promotional single on February 6, 2017. "American Teen" was released as the fifth and final promotional single on February 22, 2017.

The promotional single "Reasons" was released on December 2, 2016, but was not included on American Teen.

Commercial performance
American Teen debuted at number nine on the Billboard 200 with 37,000 album-equivalent units, of which 12,000 were pure album sales. In August 2017, it reached a peak of number four. On October 24, 2017, the album was certified platinum by the Recording Industry Association of America (RIAA) for combined sales, streaming and track-sales equivalent of one million units. By the end of 2017, American Teen had accumulated 1,220,000 album-equivalent units in the United States, with 147,000 being pure sales.

Critical reception

Reviewing for Vice, Robert Christgau said that "the first half of this R&B album justifies its title with a clarity and candor so astonishing it overshadows the music's racial identity [...] Second half is skillful but conventional—seven succinct, catchy unrequited love songs all in a row. Khalid Robinson sings in a winning conversational murmur with room for growth, and because the vocals are as unassuming as the words, the song structures he concocts with various pals and pros seems more straightforward than they are." He later called the album a "teenpop milestone". Ryan B. Patrick of Exclaim! wrote that the album "generally plays things straight up, not too concerned about chasing bleeding edge sounds but resting nicely in the pocket between conventional R&B and a future-pop-minded audience". Glenn Gamboa of Newsday gave the album a grade of B+ and summarized that American Teen shows Khalid as a "natural" and "establishes him as one of R&B's up-and-coming stars". In a three-star review for AllMusic, Andy Kellman said that on lead single "Location" "and through much of what fills out American Teen, [...] Robinson's not one to get worked up. He's in no particular rush, content to drift through life while accepting, and occasionally sort of celebrating, the present."

Track listing
Credits adapted from liner notes.

Notes
 "8teen" is stylized as "8TEEN".
 signifies an additional producer.

Charts

Weekly charts

Year-end charts

Decade-end charts

Certifications

References

2017 debut albums
Khalid (singer) albums
RCA Records albums
Columbia Records albums
Albums produced by Joel Little
Albums produced by DJDS